John Van Kessel (born December 19, 1969) is a Canadian former professional ice hockey player. Van Kessel played ten professional seasons, in the American Hockey League (AHL), East Coast Hockey League(ECHL) and International Hockey League (IHL) in North America, and in the Deutsche Eishockey Liga (DEL) and Austrian Hockey League (AL) in Europe.

Playing career
Van Kessel was born in Bridgewater, Nova Scotia. He played junior hockey in the Ontario Hockey League for the Belleville Bulls and the North Bay Centennials. After the 1987–88 season, he was drafted in the 1988 NHL Entry Draft in the third round, 49th overall by the Los Angeles Kings. He would play two further seasons of junior before debuting in professional play with the New Haven Nighthawks after his junior season ended in 1989–90. He then joined the Phoenix Roadrunners of the IHL where he played two seasons. In the 1992 NHL Expansion Draft, Van Kessel was selected by the Ottawa Senators of the NHL in the second and last draft by an NHL team of his rights. He would play in the AHL and ECHL until 1996 when he moved to Europe to play. He first played in Slovenia, for Sportina Bled HK. He then moved in 1997 to Germany's Deutsche Eishockey Liga and spent the 1997-98 season playing for Kaufbeurer Adler, EV Landshut and Düsseldorfer EG. He played one more season in the DEL, with the Krefeld Pinguine. He did not play for two seasons then played a three-games tryout with EV Zeltweg of the Austrian Hockey League in 2001–02 to end his professional career.

Personal
On November 10, 1999 his daughter Emily was born in Germany.

Career statistics

References

External links

1969 births
Living people
Kaufbeurer Adler players
Belleville Bulls players
Cape Breton Oilers players
Düsseldorfer EG players
Hampton Roads Admirals players
Ice hockey people from Nova Scotia
Krefeld Pinguine players
EV Landshut players
Los Angeles Kings draft picks
New Haven Nighthawks players
New Haven Senators players
North Bay Centennials players
People from Bridgewater, Nova Scotia
Phoenix Roadrunners (IHL) players
Wheeling Thunderbirds players
Sacramento River Rats players
Canadian ice hockey right wingers